Radiarctia is a genus of moths in the family Erebidae from Afrotropics.

Species
 Radiarctia jacksoni (Rothschild, 1910)
 Radiarctia screabile (Wallengren, 1875)
 Radiarctia screabile nyangana Haynes, 2011
 Radiarctia melanochoria (Hering, 1932)
 Radiarctia sinefascia (Hampson, 1916)

References

 , 2006: New genera and species of Arctiinae from the Afrotropical fauna (Lepidoptera: Arctiidae). Nachrichten des entomologische Vereins Apollo 27 (3): 139-152.
 , 2011: A review of some of the Binna-like species of Afrotropical Spilosoma Curtis (1825) listed by Goodger & Watson (1995) and including the genus Radiarctia Dubatolov (2006) (Lepidoptera: Arctiidae, Arctiinae). Zootaxa 2811: 22-36.
Natural History Museum Lepidoptera generic names catalog

Spilosomina
Glossata genera